Dowlat Shanlu (also Romanized as Dowlat Shānlū; also known as Dowlat Shāmlū) is a village in Shahrestaneh Rural District, Now Khandan District, Dargaz County, Razavi Khorasan Province, Iran. At the 2006 census, its population was 363, in 94 families.

References 

Populated places in Dargaz County